Hannemanneia is a monotypic snout moth genus described by Rolf-Ulrich Roesler in 1967. Its only species, Hannemanneia tacapella, was described by Émile Louis Ragonot in 1887. It is known from South Africa and Tunisia.

References

Moths described in 1887
Phycitinae
Moths of Africa
Monotypic moth genera